Douglas Patrick Warren (born March 18, 1981 in Palatine, Illinois) is an American former soccer goalkeeper, who last played for the New England Revolution in Major League Soccer, in 2008.  He was a member of the U.S. team at the 2001 FIFA World Youth Championship.

Youth
Warren attended William Fremd High School where he was a Parade Magazine High School All American.  He began his college soccer career at Indiana University, where he played in 1999.  After his freshman season, Warren transferred to Clemson, where he emerged as one of the best goalkeepers in the NCAA.  Named first team All-ACC all three years at Clemson, Warren was named a first team All-American as a senior in 2002, as he helped the Tigers to the Elite Eight.

In 2001, Warren was on the roster of the U.S. U-20 national team at the 2001 FIFA World Youth Championship.  Beginning in 2002, he began playing with the U.S. U-23 national team as it prepared for the 2004 Summer Olympic qualification campaign.

Professional
Following his senior season, Warren was drafted 14th overall in the 2003 MLS SuperDraft by D.C. United.  A reserve for much of the year, Warren was forced into action late in the season when starter Nick Rimando suffered a season-ending ACL injury.  Warren started the season's last five regular season games and both their playoff games, and although he impressed, failed to win a game.

In 2004, Warren again found himself as a backup to Rimando.  However, shortly into the season, a string of mediocre performances by Rimando led Peter Nowak to give Warren another opportunity to seize the starting position.  Warren started only one game, however, a loss in which he surrendered three goals, before being replaced again by rookie Troy Perkins.  Perkins impressed enough to earn the starting job, and Warren was released soon thereafter.  He spent the rest of the season with the New England Revolution, as an injury replacement for the injured Adin Brown. The Revolution acquired him for good after the season.  He spent 2005 behind Matt Reis, making two appearances.  Due to the consistency of Reis, Warren did not appear in MLS play in 2006 or 2007, although he remained the Revolution's second-choice keeper.

Honors

New England Revolution
Lamar Hunt U.S. Open Cup (1): 2007

References

External links
 MLS Player Bio

1981 births
Living people
American soccer players
Indiana Hoosiers men's soccer players
Clemson Tigers men's soccer players
D.C. United players
New England Revolution players
Northern Virginia Royals players
Richmond Kickers players
Association football goalkeepers
Major League Soccer players
United States men's under-20 international soccer players
United States men's under-23 international soccer players
D.C. United draft picks
All-American men's college soccer players